Acanthonematidae is an extinct family of sea snails, marine gastropod mollusks in the clade Sorbeoconcha.

According to the taxonomy of the Gastropoda by Bouchet & Rocroi (2005) the family Canterburyellidae has no subfamilies. It is unassigned to superfamily.

References

Caenogastropoda
Gastropod families